The Chinati Foundation/La Fundación Chinati is a contemporary art museum located in Marfa, Texas, and based upon the ideas of its founder, artist Donald Judd.

Mission
The specific intention of Chinati is to preserve and present to the public permanent large-scale installations by a limited number of artists. The emphasis is on works in which art and the surrounding landscape are inextricably linked. As Judd wrote in the foundation's first catalogue in 1987:

It takes a great deal of time and thought to install work carefully. This should not always be thrown away. Most art is fragile and some should be placed and never moved again. Somewhere a portion of contemporary art has to exist as an example of what the art and its context were meant to be. Somewhere, just as the platinum iridium meter guarantees the tape measure, a strict measure must exist for the art of this time and place.

History

Donald Judd first visited Marfa, Texas, in 1971, and moved himself from New York to Marfa as a full-time resident in 1977. Construction and installation at the site began in 1979 with initial assistance from the Dia Art Foundation in New York. The Chinati Foundation opened to the public in 1986 as an independent, non-profit, publicly funded institution.

Chinati was originally conceived to exhibit the work of Donald Judd, John Chamberlain and Dan Flavin. However, the idea of the foundation developed further and its collection was enriched over years, and now the permanent collection has expanded to include Carl Andre, Ingólfur Arnarsson, Roni Horn, Ilya Kabakov, Richard Long, Claes Oldenburg and Coosje van Bruggen, David Rabinowitch, and John Wesley. Each artist's work is installed in a separate building or outdoor area on the museum's grounds. In addition to the permanent collection, regular temporary exhibitions feature modern and contemporary art of diverse media.

It was Judd's goal at Chinati to bring art, architecture, and nature together in order to form a coherent whole.

Opened in July 2016, this installation utilizes Fort D. A. Russell's ruined former hospital, rebuilding the structure within its original footprint while incorporating several architectural interventions to modify the building's dynamics of light and space.

Also in 2022, the Chinati Foundation – along with the Central Marfa Historic District in Marfa — was officially added to the National Register of Historic Places.

Directors
 1994–2010: Marianne Stockebrand 
 2011–2012: Thomas Kellein 
 2013–2022: Jenny Moore

Collection

Community
The Chinati Foundation sponsors art and education programs, establishing close links to the local community and other cultural institutions and universities in the United States and abroad. Started by Judd in 1989, Chinati's Artist in Residence Program provides artists from around the world an opportunity to develop and exhibit their work in a stimulating environment. Its Internship Program offers students from a variety of disciplines hands-on museum experience. Each summer the museum hosts art classes for local students. Chinati has been producing an annual newsletter in English and Spanish since 1995 (some of the back issues are available at the Chinati bookstore and all can be downloaded at foundation's website.

Visiting
The Chinati Foundation has reopened, after being closed in response to the COVID-19 pandemic.

The closest airports to Marfa are in El Paso and Midland/Odessa. It is about a three-hour drive from either airport.

Further reading
Ackerman, James S., and Chinati Foundation. 2000. Art and Architecture. Marfa, Texas: Chinati Foundation. 
Andre, Carl, and Chinati Foundation. 2000. Art in the Landscape. Marfa, Texas: Chinati Foundation. 
Bell, Tiffany, Dan Flavin, and Chinati Foundation. 2002. Light in Architecture and Art: The Work of Dan Flavin. Marfa, Texas: Chinati Foundation. 
Chamberlain, John, and William C. Agee. 2009. It's All in the Fit: The Work of John Chamberlain. Marfa, Texas: Chinati Foundation. 
Antliff, Allan, and Donald Judd. 2009. The Writings of Donald Judd. Marfa, Texas: Chinati Foundation. 
Stockebrand, Marianne, Donald Judd, and Rudi Fuchs. 2010. Chinati: the vision of Donald Judd. Marfa, Texas: Chinati Foundation. 
Stockebrand, Marianne. 2020. Chinati: the vision of Donald Judd. Marfa, Texas: Chinati Foundation.

Notes and references

External links

The Chinati Foundation/La Fundación Chinati
The Judd Foundation
 The Dia Art Foundation

Art museums and galleries in Texas
Museums in Presidio County, Texas
Modern art museums in the United States
Art museums established in 1986
1986 establishments in Texas
Marfa, Texas